Fairmont High School may refer to:

Fairmont High School (Cape Town, South Africa) — Fairmont, Durbanville, Cape Town
Fairmont High School (Minnesota) — Fairmont, Minnesota
Fairmont High School (North Carolina) — Fairmont, North Carolina
Fairmont High School (Ohio) — Kettering, Ohio
Fairmont Senior High School — Fairmont, West Virginia
East Fairmont High School — Fairmont, West Virginia
Fairmont Preparatory Academy — Anaheim, California
Fairmont Heights High School — Capitol Heights, Maryland